Sami Hannu Antero Kapanen (born 14 June 1973) is a Finnish former professional ice hockey coach and former player. He played 12 NHL seasons for the Hartford Whalers, Carolina Hurricanes and Philadelphia Flyers. He is the majority owner of KalPa in the Finnish league. Kapanen's son, Kasperi Kapanen, is a member of the St. Louis Blues.

Playing career
Kapanen was drafted 87th overall in the 1995 NHL Entry Draft by the Hartford Whalers. His first NHL season was in 1995–96, when he played 35 games with Hartford. The Whalers relocated to become the Carolina Hurricanes following the 1996–97 season and Kapanen averaged 24 goals and 35 assists in his next five seasons with Carolina. His best season was in 2001–02 when he scored 27 goals and 42 assists for 69 points. He was selected twice for the NHL All Star Game (2000, 2002), winning the Individual event for "the Fastest skater" on both occasions.

On 7 February 2003, Kapanen was traded to the Philadelphia Flyers along with Ryan Bast for Pavel Brendl and Bruno St. Jacques. In his first two seasons with Philadelphia, Kapanen played 31 playoff games, scoring 17 points.

Kapanen has played three times for Finland at the Winter Olympics. In 18 Olympic games he scored 2 goals and 3 assists for 5 points. In the NHL, Kapanen has played 831 regular season games, scoring 189 goals and 269 assists for 458 points. He has also played in 87 playoff games, scoring 13 goals and 22 assists for 35 points. Kapanen also won a gold medal at the 1995 Ice Hockey World Championships.

Since 2003, Kapanen has also been the majority owner of the Finnish hockey team KalPa Kuopio, the same club that gave him his start as a professional. One of the minority owners is Kimmo Timonen who in 2007 became Kapanen's teammate on the Flyers. Following the 2007–08 season, Kapanen announced that he was retiring from the NHL and he would be returning to Finland to play for KalPa. He retired as a player after the 2009–10 season.

On 7 April 2011, Kapanen announced that he would be doing a comeback as a player in KalPa, playing on a two-year contract. He, however, stepped down as the club's chief executive officer (CEO) and instead handed that role over to his brother Kimmo Kapanen.

Coaching career
Kapanen started his coaching career in the Finnish Liiga with KalPa (2017-2019).  On April 2, 2019, Kapanen was named head coach of HC Lugano in the National League for the 2019/20 and 2020/21 season, but was dismissed on December 18 2019.

Awards
 Bronze Medal at the Winter Olympics in 1994.
 Named to the SM-liiga First All-Star Team in 1994.
 Gold Medal at the World Championships 1995.
 Bronze Medal at the Winter Olympics in 1998.
 Played in the NHL All-Star Game in 2000.
 Named Best Forward at World Championships 2001.
 Played in the NHL All-Star Game in 2002.
 Awarded the Yanick Dupre Memorial in 2004.
 Awarded the Gene Hart Memorial Award in 2007.

Records
 Tied a record for scoring two consecutive overtime goals in two consecutive games. (Subsequently broken by Andrew Cogliano)
 Two-time NHL All Star game individual event Fastest Skater winner (2000, 2002) completing a lap around an NHL rink in 13.649 resp. 14.039 seconds.
 Fastest Man on ice awarded when he completed a lap around an NHL rink in 12.7 seconds.

Career statistics

Regular season and playoffs

International

References

External links

1973 births
Living people
Carolina Hurricanes players
Finnish ice hockey right wingers
Finnish ice hockey world championship gold medalists
Hartford Whalers draft picks
Hartford Whalers players
HC Kometa Brno players
HIFK (ice hockey) players
Ice hockey players at the 1994 Winter Olympics
Ice hockey players at the 1998 Winter Olympics
Ice hockey players at the 2002 Winter Olympics
KalPa players
Medalists at the 1994 Winter Olympics
Medalists at the 1998 Winter Olympics
National Hockey League All-Stars
Olympic bronze medalists for Finland
Olympic ice hockey players of Finland
Olympic medalists in ice hockey
Sportspeople from Vantaa
Philadelphia Flyers players
Springfield Falcons players
Finnish expatriate ice hockey players in the United States
Finnish expatriate ice hockey players in the Czech Republic
Finnish expatriate ice hockey coaches
Finnish ice hockey coaches
Finnish expatriate sportspeople in Switzerland
Philadelphia Flyers scouts
Finnish ice hockey administrators
Ice hockey executives